Thalles may refer to:

 Thalles (footballer, born 1995) (1995–2019), full name Thalles Lima de Conceição Penha, Brazilian football striker
 Thalles (footballer, born 1998), full name Thalles Gabriel Morais dos Reis, Brazilian football midfielder

See also
 Thales (disambiguation)